El Rey is the seventh studio album by The Wedding Present. It was released in the US on May 20, 2008, by Manifesto Records, and on May 26, 2008, in the UK by Vibrant Records/Pinnacle Records. The album is the band's first album since 2005's Take Fountain. El Rey was preceded by the first single "The Thing I Like Best About Him Is His Girlfriend" as a digital download only.

Production
The Wedding Present arranged new material at Swing House and Cole Studios, both in Hollywood, California, and at Q10 in Glenrothes, Scotland. El Rey was produced by Steve Albini, the band, and Pete Magdaleno. Sessions were held in January 2008 at Electrical Audio in Chicago, Illinois, with Albini handling recording. Additional overdubs were done at The Laundry Room in Los Angeles, California, with Magdaleno handling recording, assisted by Ulysses Noriega. Albini mixed the album at Electrical Audio; Castro sequenced the album, before it was mastered by John Golden at Golden Sounds in Ventura, California, with assistance from JJ Golden.

Track listing
Track listing per booklet.

 "Santa Ana Winds" (Gedge, Castro) - 3:56
 "Spider-Man on Hollywood" (Gedge, McConville) - 3:30
 "I Lost the Monkey" (Gedge, Cleave) - 3:50
 "Soup" (Gedge, Ramsay) - 3:49
 "Palisades" (Gedge, Castro) - 3:51
 "The Trouble with Men" (Gedge, Ramsay) - 5:22
 "Model, Actress, Whatever..." (Gedge, Castro) - 3:58
 "Don't Take Me Home Until I'm Drunk" (Gedge, McConville) - 3:07
 "The Thing I Like Best About Him Is His Girlfriend" (Santa Monica and La Brea Version) (Gedge, Castro) - 4:34
 "Boo Boo" (Gedge, Castro) - 6:23
 "Swingers" (Gedge, Cleave) - 3:05
 "Back for Good" (Exclusive Bonus Track) - 4:41 - iTunes Store only, cover of a Take That track

Personnel
Personnel per booklet.

The Wedding Present
 David Gedge – lead vocals, guitars, mellotron
 Christopher McConville – guitars, Hammond organ, mellotron
 Terry de Castro – bass guitar, backing vocals, Hammond organ, lead vocals (track 11)
 Graeme Ramsay – drums, percussion, mellotron

Production and design
 Steve Albini – recording, mixing, producer
 The Wedding Present – producer 
 Pete Magdaleno – producer, additional overdub recording
 Ulysses Noriega – additional overdub assistant
 Terry de Castro – sequenced
 John Golden – mastering
 JJ Golden – mastering assistant
 Egelnick and Webb – sleeve design
 J. Antoinette McMillan – photography

References

2008 albums
The Wedding Present albums
Albums produced by Steve Albini